Fhatuwani 'Rasta' Rasivhenge (born in Johannesburg on 3 January 1986) is a South African rugby union referee who is a member of the South African Rugby Union (SARU) Premier Panel.
He was appointed to referee the final of the rugby sevens tournament at the 2016 Summer Olympics.

Career

Rasivhenge has been a regular referee on the IRB Sevens World Series circuit since the 2011–12 season and also refereed in South African domestic rugby union competitions, the Currie Cup, Vodacom Cup and Varsity Cup since 2010.

Rasivhenge was also a rugby sevens referee during the 2014 Commonwealth Games in Glasgow, Scotland.

In 2014, Rasivhenge took a sabbatical from the South African Rugby Union and was recruited by the Australian Rugby Union; he subsequently appeared as an Australian referee in the IRB Sevens World Series.

He returned to South Africa prior to the 2015 Currie Cup Premier Division and signed a contract with SARU until 2019.

In 2016, Rasivhenge was added to the referees' roster for the 2016 Super Rugby season for the first time.

Rasivhenge was also selected as a referee for the 2016 Olympic Games in Rio De Janeiro, Brazil. At the games, he was appointed to referee the final of the games between England and Fiji, won by the Fijians 41-7.

References

Living people
South African expatriates in Australia
South African rugby union referees
1986 births
ARU referees
SARU referees
Currie Cup referees
United Rugby Championship referees
Top 14 referees
Super Rugby referees